Ruben Pacheco is a Venezuelan diplomat. He is the Venezuelan ambassador to fellow OPEC nation Angola. In 2007, Pacheco oversaw the creation of the Angola-Venezuela Chamber of Commerce, which both countries hope will increase bilateral ties. Has already served his country in Brasil, Switzerland, Colômbia, Uruguay and South Africa.

Sources
 Angola, Venezuela Brace Exchange Prensa Latina, 20 May 2007

Year of birth missing (living people)
Living people
Venezuelan diplomats
Ambassadors of Venezuela to Angola